Luis María Chiappe (born 18 June 1962) is an Argentine paleontologist born in Buenos Aires who is best known for his discovery of the first sauropod nesting sites in the badlands of Patagonia in 1997 and for his work on the origin and early evolution of Mesozoic birds.  He is currently the Vice President of Research and Collections at the Natural History Museum of Los Angeles County and director of the museum's Dinosaur Institute.  He was a postdoctoral researcher at the American Museum of Natural History, New York after immigrating from Argentina. Chiappe is currently the curator of the award winning Dinosaur Hall at the Natural History Museum of Los Angeles County, an adjunct professor at the University of Southern California, BBC advisor and author of scientific and popular books.

Chiappe is a fellow of the John Simon Guggenheim Memorial Foundation, a laureate of the Alexander Humboldt Foundation, and a research fellow at the Chinese Academy of Geological Sciences, Beijing.

Academic Contributions 
Chiappe has published nearly 200 articles in peer-reviewed journals, with over 12,000 citations. He has numerous publications in high-profile scientific journals, including Annual Review of Ecology and Systematics, Current Biology, Gondwana Research, Nature, Nature Communications, Proceedings of the Royal Society B: Biological Sciences, Science, and Scientific Reports. He is best known for his extensive work on the origin and early evolution of birds, although he is also well-known for work on sauropod nesting sites and embryos from Patagonia, on which he has authored several books and articles, and on pterosaur embryos.

Below is a list of taxa that Chiappe has contributed to naming:

Books

Chiappe, L.M.; Qingjin, M. 2016. Birds of Stone. (Johns Hopkins University Press, 2016), .
Chiappe, L.M. 2007. Glorified Dinosaurs: The Origin and Early Evolution of Birds. (Wiley-Liss,2007), .
Dingus, L.; Chiappe, L.M. The Tiniest Giants: Discovering Dinosaur Eggs (Doubleday Books, 1999), .
Chiappe, L.M.; Dingus, L. Walking on Eggs: The Astonishing Discovery of Thousands of Dinosaur Eggs in the Badlands of Patagonia (Scribner, 2001), .
Chiappe, L.M.; Dingus, L. The Lost Dinosaurs: The Astonishing Discovery of the World's Largest Prehistoric Nesting Ground (Abacus, 2002), 
Chiappe, L.M.; Witmer L. Mesozoic Birds: Above the Heads of Dinosaurs (University of California Press, 2002), .

References

External links
NHM Biography

1962 births
Living people
People from Buenos Aires
Argentine paleontologists
Fellows of the American Association for the Advancement of Science
University of Southern California faculty